Herman Joseph Alerding (April 13, 1845 – December 6, 1924) was a German-born American prelate of the Roman Catholic Church. He served as bishop of the Diocese of Fort Wayne in Indiana from 1900 until his death in 1924.

Biography

Early life 
Herman Alerding was born on April 13, 1845, in Kingdom of Westphalia (in what is today Germany). After his birth, the family immigrated to the United States, settling in Newport, Kentucky. He attended the parochial school of Corpus Christi Parish. Alerding decided to become a priest, but Bishop George Carrell, the prelate for the local Diocese of Covington, refused to send him to seminary.  Carrell did not want to pay Alerding's seminary tuition.

However, in 1858, Bishop Jacques-Maurice De Saint Palais of the nearby Diocese of Vincennes sponsored Alerding at St. Charles Borromeo Seminary near Vincennes.  When St. Charles closed in 1859, Alerding transferred to St. Thomas Seminary in Bardstown, Kentucky.  He returned to Indiana in 1860 and entering St. Meinrad Seminary in St. Meinrad, Indiana. At the seminary, he mentored Paul Dresser and taught him to play several musical instruments. Dresser later became a popular composer and authored "On the Banks of the Wabash", the state song of Indiana.

After receiving the tonsure and minor orders in September 1865, Alerding was ordained to the subdiaconate on June 18, 1867, and to the diaconate on June 21.

Priesthood 
Alerding was ordained to the priesthood for the Diocese of Vincennes by Bishop Saint Palais on September 22, 1869. After his ordination, Alerding served as a curate at St. Joseph Parish in Terre Haute, Indiana, while also attending several missions throughout Parke and Sullivan Counties in Indiana He was appointed pastor in 1871 of St. Elizabeth Parish in Cambridge City, Indiana. While at Cambridge City, Alerding calmed a turbulent congregation which had been under interdict for several months, liquidated the parish debt, and purchased a site for a new church.

Alerding was transferred to St. Joseph Parish in Indianapolis in 1874, there overseeing the construction of a church, rectory, and parochial school. He briefly served as procurator of the adjoining St. Joseph Seminary until it was closed the following year. In 1883, Alerding published A History of the Catholic Church in the Diocese of Vincennes. Alerding was stricken by typhoid fever and took a trip to Europe to recover in 1884.

Bishop of Fort Wayne 
On August 30, 1900, Alerding was appointed the fourth bishop of the Diocese of Fort Wayne by Pope Leo XIII. He received his episcopal consecration on November 30, 1900, from Archbishop William Elder, with Bishops Denis O'Donaghue and Henry K. Moeller serving as co-consecrators, at the Cathedral of the Immaculate Conception in Fort Wayne. He presided over a diocesan synod in November 1903. His pew-rent policy was expressly opposed by Archbishop Diomede Falconio, the apostolic delegate to the United States.

During World War I, Alerding established the Fort Wayne Diocesan War Council. In a pastoral letter issued in December 1918, Alerding declared, "We deserved the infliction of this terrible war and its awful consequences." Under Alerding's administration, the number of diocesan priests nearly doubled from 109 in 1900 to 210 in 1925. In 1900, the diocese had 102 churches with resident pastors, 39 mission churches, and 73 parochial schools; in 1924, there were 148 churches with resident pastors, 31 mission churches, and 106 parochial schools.

Death and legacy 
On November 29, 1924, Alerding suffered three broken ribs when his car collided with a streetcar in Fort Wayne.  Already weakened by diabetes, he never recovered from the accident. Herman Alerding died in Fort Wayne on December 6, 1924, at age 79. He  was buried at the Cathedral of the Immaculate Conception in Fort Wayne.

References

1845 births
1924 deaths
People from the Province of Westphalia
German emigrants to the United States
People from Fort Wayne, Indiana
Roman Catholic Archdiocese of Indianapolis
20th-century Roman Catholic bishops in the United States
Roman Catholic bishops of Fort Wayne